The American football Regionalliga is the third tier of American football in Germany, below the German Football League and the German Football League 2.

The league is subdivided into six regional divisions, the Regionalligas (English: Regional league) Nord (North), Ost (East), West, Mitte (Central), Südwest (Southwest) and Süd (South).

History
The league was formed in 1985 with two regional divisions, Central and West. The number of divisions changed frequently in the following years, as did the name of the league, changing to Verbandsliga for a time. From 1991 it operated under name of Regionalliga again with seven divisions, one in the North and two each in the West, Central and Bavaria. From 1995 the league was reduced to four divisions, South, West, Central and Northeast, a format that remained unchanged until 2004 when the Northeast division was split into North and East divisions. Since 2004 the Regionalliga operates in the current five division format.

Organisation
The five Regionalligas are organised by the regional American football associations rather than the American Football Association of Germany, like the Regionalliga Süd which is organised by the Bavarian one.

In the 2015 season 33 clubs compete in the league, nine in the central division and six each in the other four.

The top teams of the Regionalliga divisions qualify for the play-offs to the German Football League . The division champions and runners-up of the Central and South division play each other home and away for two promotion spots to the southern division of the German Football League 2, whereby the division winner from one plays the runners-up from the other. In the north, the three division winners of the North, West and East division play each other in a single game round robin for two spots in the northern division of the GFL 2. Promotion is subject to licensing approval and can be enlarged if additional spots in the German Football League 2 become available. An overall Regionalliga championship is not played.

The bottom teams from each division are relegated and replaced with the top teams from the tier below, the American football Oberliga.

Division champions
The division champions since adaption of the current structure in 2004:

Northern region

Southern region
The division champions and runners-up since adaption of the structure in 2004:

 Bold denotes promoted teams.

The division champions since adaption of the current structure in 2017:

 Bold denotes promoted teams.

Current clubs
The Regionalliga clubs for the 2022 season:

References

External links
  German American Football Association website  
  Football History  Historic American football tables from Germany 

American football leagues in Germany
1985 establishments in Germany
Sports leagues established in 1985